James Willmott-Brown (also credited as Willmott-Brown and Mr Willmott-Brown) is a fictional character from the BBC soap opera EastEnders, played by William Boyde. The character originally appeared in Albert Square from 1986 to 1989, where he established the square's second pub – "The Dagmar" – and instigated a feud with his business rival Den Watts (Leslie Grantham). Willmott-Brown then developed a romantic obsession with his employee Kathy Beale (Gillian Taylforth), which sparked the events of the character raping her in 1988. 

Following his imprisonment for Kathy's rape, Willmott-Brown made a brief comeback in 1992 after he moved back into Albert Square; however, he was forced to leave by Kathy's former husband Pete (Peter Dean) just weeks later. After an absence of 25 years, Willmott-Brown returned on 22 September 2017 as the show's hidden main antagonist upon being revealed to be the boss of Max Branning (Jake Wood) in their vengeful plot to destroy the square; with Willmott-Brown serving as the true mastermind behind the events in Max's revenge story arc carried out by his company, Weyland & Co. The character departed once again on 28 December 2017 after his scheme to recoup his relationship with Kathy by controlling the Square had ultimately failed, and he was left bedridden and disowned by both his son and daughter for his actions.

Storylines

1986–1989
James Willmott-Brown, an ex-army officer, arrives in Albert Square in March 1986 as area manager for 'Luxford and Copley', the brewery that owns The Queen Victoria public house. Willmott-Brown decides to move to the square and buys Debbie Wilkins's (Shirley Cheriton) house at 43 Albert Square when she sells it, following fiancé Andy O'Brien's (Ross Davidson), death. He and Debbie date briefly but it doesn't last and Pat Wicks (Pam St Clement) also tries to seduce him unsuccessfully. During the early years, he is friendly with Colin Russell (Michael Cashman).

Willmott-Brown gives up his job as brewery manager and buys a disused pub on Turpin Road, refurbishing it as a wine bar and names it "The Dagmar". Local publican Den Watts (Leslie Grantham) is unhappy about the competition and is disgusted to learn that his estranged wife, Angie (Anita Dobson), is manageress. Willmott-Brown also allows Angie and her daughter, Sharon (Letitia Dean), to live in the flat above. The Dagmar opens for business and both Willmott-Brown and Den compete for best decorated pub in 'The London In Bloom' competition and in a five-a-side football match, and constantly try to poach each other's staff. The following year, the Dagmar begins to lose business as the residents of Walford never really take to the upper-class establishment and Willmott-Brown has competition from The Queen Victoria and Strokes winebar, which Den takes over after giving up tenancy of The Queen Vic. At this point, Gregory Mantel (Pavel Douglas) arrives and he is a member of the criminal organisation known as The Firm. Mantel demands that Willmott-Brown allow his company, 'Walford Investments', to buy into the business. Willmott-Brown refuses, and as a result, none of his creditors will trade with him and the business suffers even more. This is escalated when Willmott-Brown learns that Den is in league with the Firm and reports him to the police for shady dealings at Strokes wine bar but Simon Wicks (Nick Berry), barman at The Dagmar, overhears Willmott-Brown talking to the police and tells Den. When the residents learn that Willmott-Brown has informed the police, he loses all his customers, pushing Willmott-Brown to financial ruin. This makes him frantic and his behaviour becomes erratic.

Meanwhile, Willmott-Brown gives Kathy Beale (Gillian Taylforth) a job as a barmaid but this causes problems between her and her husband, Pete (Peter Dean). The rift worsens when it becomes clear that Wilmott-Brown has a romantic interest in Kathy. With everyone now ignoring him, Kathy soon becomes his only friend. He buys her presents and confides in her about the sorry state of his business, the break-up of his marriage and how it affected his children, Sophie (Natasha Knight) and Luke (Henry Power). Pete is furious about the amount of time Kathy spends with Willmott-Brown, but their constant arguing only drives her away. One night after Kathy argues with Pete again, Willmott-Brown invites her to his place for a glass of wine after work. When it becomes clear that he is trying to seduce her, she tries to leave but he refuses to take no for an answer and the seduction ends in rape. Den finds Kathy an emotional wreck. When he realises what has happened, he takes Kathy home to her family and her niece, Michelle Fowler (Susan Tully), persuades her to report the rape to the police. Den also calls his contacts within the Firm, Joanne Francis (Pamela Salem) and Brad Williams (Jonathan Stratt), and demands revenge. He watches gleefully as a fire-bomb is thrown into the Dagmar and it catches fire. Unfortunately for Den, this act leads to his imprisonment, after The Firm expect him to take the rap for the arson and later decide that they want him dead. When Willmott-Brown returns days later, he is horrified to see what has happened to the Dagmar. He also receives extreme hostility from residents of the square. When arrested, Willmott-Brown claims that Kathy consented and claims that it is common knowledge that they were having an affair. When asked about Kathy's bruises, he claims that they are the result of their rampant sexual encounter and suggests that Pete is a violent man and Kathy has lied to avoid his wrath. Willmott-Brown thinks he has said enough to fool the police and is stunned when he is charged with rape. He stands trial in April 1989, but not before attempting to bribe Kathy to drop the charges. She allows him to think that she is ready to take his hush money, only to reveal that D.I Bob Ashley (Robin Lermitte), is listening next door. Kathy is relieved when he is found guilty and imprisoned for three years. However, Pete and Kathy's marriage is destroyed as Kathy cannot stand him touching her and they separate soon after.

1992
When Willmott-Brown is released, he returns to the square in January 1992 and tries to buy the flats that Grant (Ross Kemp) and Phil Mitchell (Steve McFadden) are selling. He plans to move back to Walford and set up another business and sends Kathy a tape asking her to meet him at his hotel in Hampstead. He promises that if she objects, he will disappear and never return. His return sends shockwaves around the square and Pete arranges his son Ian Beale (Adam Woodyatt), Frank Butcher (Mike Reid) and Big Ron (Ron Tarr) to become his Gaing mob so they can track Willmott-Brown down as Kathy plans to meet him. Kathy gets there first and after listening to Willmott-Brown's tale of his hard time in prison and how much he has changed, she asks him to leave the Square for good and never return. Despite his promise, however, he refuses to leave Walford. Kathy then leaves feeling repulsed and cheated, but unknown to her, Pete has also come to enact his revenge. Pete, Ian, Frank and Big Ron all force him into their car and drive him to Pete's high-rise flat building, where Pete threatens to push him off unless he signs a paper stating that he will leave Walford and never return. Immediately after, Willmott-Brown phones his solicitor and takes out an injunction on Pete, but proceeds to move to the Square. He continues sending Kathy tapes, confessing his undying love for her.

Eventually Kathy and Pete confront Willmott-Brown at his house and he and Pete nearly come to blows. An emotional Kathy finally relays her hurt and anger over the rape and her fury that Willmott-Brown has never apologised for the act. Willmott-Brown protests that they had something truly special, but after a heated conversation, Kathy makes him realise how deluded he is by showing him the destruction he'd caused her and her family. In a bid for attention, Willmott-Brown threatens to commit suicide but Kathy stops him, refusing to allow him off the hook so easily. Willmott-Brown finally apologises for raping her and begs for her forgiveness. Kathy is pleased he is sorry, but refuses to forgive him, feeling her forgiveness would give him permission to stop being sorry and she tells him she is never going to do anything he asks, ever again, not even that. The confrontation and the apology finally gives Kathy the closure she needs, while a defeated Willmott-Brown leaves Walford.
 
In 1994, Kathy begins having recurring nightmares about Willmott-Brown so Phil, who is now her boyfriend, goes in search of him, and ended up tracking down his wife Elizabeth Willmott-Brown (Helena Breck), who ends up reavealing to Phil that Willmott-Brown is back in prison for raping another woman.

2017
Twenty-five years after leaving Walford, Willmott-Brown anonymously lays flowers addressed to Kathy at a memorial for her step-grandson Steven Beale (Aaron Sidwell). The following day, Willmott-Brown meets with his children — Sophie, who is now going by the name "Fi", (now Lisa Faulkner), Luke (now Adam Astill) and Josh Hemmings (Eddie Eyre) — and Elizabeth's brother Hugo Browning (Simon Williams), before introducing himself to Fi's partner, Max Branning (Jake Wood). Willmott-Brown, Luke and Hugo discuss purchasing the café and Willmott-Brown tells them he has a better plan for the premises than their idea of studio flats. Willmott-Brown arrives in Albert Square and lets himself into the café, and he, Luke and Hugo go through their development plans for Albert Square. Luke starts a relationship with Ben Mitchell (Harry Reid), but breaks up with him when he finds out Ben is Kathy's son from her marriage to Phil. Luke tells Willmott-Brown that he and Ben are back together on his request and questions Willmott-Brown's interest in Ben and Kathy. After Max manages to persuade Kathy's other son, Ian Beale (Adam Woodyatt) and his wife, Jane Beale (Laurie Brett), to sell the café and move away, Willmott-Brown tells Max he wants Ian to remain. Fi promises Willmott-Brown that she will get the sealed bids from Max and Luke promises to persuade Jay Brown (Jamie Borthwick) to sell the car lot land. When Max contemplates getting the sealed bids from Carmel Kazemi's (Bonnie Langford) work laptop, he phones Willmott-Brown, refusing to go through with it. Max meets up with Willmott-Brown, Fi and Luke and tells them that he doesn't want to be a part of their plan any longer. Fi turns up to see Max at Carmel's house, where they have sex. However, unbeknownst to Max, Fi hacks into Carmel's computer and steals the sealed bids. When James finds out about Max and Fi's relationship, Fi presents him with the sealed bids to earn Willmott-Brown's approval.

On Halloween, when Kathy shuts up the café, she is startled when Willmott-Brown comes in. As Willmott-Brown acts casual, Kathy takes hold of a knife and Willmott-Brown tells her that he has been diagnosed with terminal liver cancer. Kathy rubbishes Willmott-Brown's beliefs that they are alike and Willmott-Brown says the reason for his visit is to move on from the past. Kathy wants him to explain truthfully what happened on the night of the rape, but when he refuses to do so, Kathy retells it – demanding to know when he decided to rape her and she realises that Willmott-Brown chose to rape her when he locked up The Dagmar. Kathy tells Willmott-Brown that he has scared her that night like the night he raped her, but Willmott-Brown, still in denial – refuses to apologise for the rape and he leaves Kathy his address. Luke attends Phil's daughter, Louise Mitchell's (Tilly Keeper) birthday meal to make sure Phil knows nothing about Willmott-Brown seeing Kathy, believing Kathy would tell him. Luke contacts Willmott-Brown to inform him that Phil is unaware. Kathy confides in Ian that Willmott-Brown is back and Ian contacts Phil. Phil visits Willmott-Brown and warns him away from Kathy. Phil realises Luke is Willmott-Brown's son when he finds a photo of them. Phil tells Kathy that Luke is Willmott-Brown's son and Phil fails to warn Luke away from Ben. Ben is angry with what Phil did and when Kathy tries to get Ben and Phil to make up, Kathy tells Ben that Phil was protecting him as Willmott-Brown raped her. After struggling to process what he is told, Ben is determined to hurt Willmott-Brown, but Kathy orders Ben to keep out of it as it happened to her and not him. Ben confronts Luke with what he has been told and Luke tells Ben that Willmott-Brown wants to meet him. Ben takes a hammer when he meets him and without Luke's presence, Ben threatens Willmott-Brown, but he insists to Ben that he and Kathy were having an affair and she consented. Luke rushes into the office and pulls Ben off Willmott-Brown, who tells Ben he knows he doesn't trust or believe Kathy.

When Max's daughter, Lauren Branning (Jacqueline Jossa), finds out about Project Dagmar and the model showing how Albert Square will be, Willmott-Brown demands to Max that Lauren keeps quiet. Willmott-Brown meets Lauren when she refuses to back down and he convinces her that the project has been dropped and to delete photos of the plans. Fi finds out that the Carters have raised £50,000 and Willmott-Brown, Luke and Hugo later arrive and tells them they own Grafton Hill. They serve the Carters with an eviction notice, putting up the money owed to the original £60,000. Kathy and Ian are shocked to see him in the pub. Willmott-Brown reveals that they plan to turn their obtained buildings into luxury flats. When Max proposes to Fi, Willmott-Brown and Luke reveal that they have used him as they have doubted his loyalty and burn his cheque. Willmott-Brown orders Josh to serve an eviction notice on Ian after Lauren refuses to do so. Ian arranges to meet Willmott-Brown and tapes their conversation, where Willmott-Brown initially tells Ian that he and Kathy loved each other, but he admits to raping Kathy. Willmott-Brown deletes the recording when Ian is restrained. Josh visits Lauren and tells her the development can be stopped, but he needs her help whilst he accesses Willmott-Brown computer that has documents to prove that Willmott-Brown bribes council officials. Whilst Willmott-Brown and Fi attend a press launch, Josh downloads files that can get the development stopped and Lauren gets arresting when she stages a protest at the launch to hold Willmott-Brown and Fi up. When Willmott-Brown returns, Lauren contacts Josh and Willmott-Brown demands the downloaded files, so Josh decides to quit his job. Fi tries to get Josh to return, but he tells Fi that Willmott-Brown has ruined and controls their lives just like with their mothers. When Fi attempts to question Willmott-Brown over why he never allowed Josh's mother, Wendy, to get a job or why Elizabeth committed suicide, Willmott-Brown pushes her to the ground. Fi asks Kathy about the rape and her version causes Fi to be physically sick. Towards the end of the year after Christmas, Fi tells Willmott-Brown that she believes he did rape Kathy – prompting him to throw her out of his building. He then goes to see Kathy and attempts to manipulate her into starting anew with him; Kathy appears to be interested at first, but then grabs James at the front and stands up for herself – telling Willmott-Brown that he is "going to hell" regardless of what he does. When he returns to his office, Willmott-Brown is horrified to find that his safe has had a break-in and that all his documents – which he showed Fi earlier on about the secrecy to exposing Weyland & Co – are missing, just as the police arrive. Whilst desperately trying to destroy them, he suffers a heart attack. It soon transpires that Fi, disgusted with her father's callousness and the discovery that he raped Kathy, stole the documents and reported Weyland & Co's criminal activities to the police. After forcing Hugo to relinquish Weyland & Co of their power over the Square, destroying the company in the process, Fi visits Willmott-Brown in hospital and tells him she is not going to keep on trying to get his approval as she wanted his love. As Willmott-Brown reaches out for Fi, she tells the staff that she is not his daughter before leaving – having disowned her father and leaving him to suffer alone.

Development

Storyline development

In 1988, the character of Willmott-Brown raped Kathy Beale (Gillian Taylforth) in a "prolific and controversial [...] deplorable" rape storyline. Taylforth was apprehensive about the storyline when it was pitched to her, commenting that she "didn't think it was a great idea at first" as her character had already been raped and "didn't think Wilmott-Brown was a very likely rapist." Taylforth said she "loved working" with Boyde, saying he played the part "brilliantly" as well as it being his own idea "to step up Wilmott-Brown's drinking in order for the rape to make some sense."

Boyde departed the role in 1989, when his character was found guilty of rape. The storyline "had massive repercussions for the residents of Walford", notably for Den Watts (Leslie Grantham), as the storyline resulted in his imprisonment for "taking the rap" over The Dagmar fire caused by The Firm. Boyde returned in 1992 for a short stint, which saw Willmott-Brown "try and reintegrate in Walford" but a "lack of remorse saw him receive significant backlash."

Reintroduction
Boyde reprised his role as Willmott-Brown in September 2017 and the actor expressed his delight at returning to the serial. Willmott-Brown returns to overpower Albert Square, the show's setting, and destroy "everything and anyone in their way". Duncan Lindsay of the Metro reported that his return storyline would centre around "power, control, money and revenge" as well as confronting Kathy, who Willmott-Brown cites as the person who destroyed his life.

The characters of Fi Browning (Lisa Faulkner) and Josh Hemmings (Eddie Eyre), who joined the show in 2017, were revealed as Willmott-Brown's children. Faulkner's character was explained as Willmott-Brown's daughter, Sophie Willmott-Brown, who appeared in the serial in 1987 and 1992 as a child, portrayed by Natasha Knight. Adam Astill was recast in the role of Willmott-Brown's son, Luke Willmott-Brown, (now Luke Browning), who previously appeared, portrayed by Henry Povey, alongside his sister. The build-up to Willmott-Brown's return began when Max Branning (Jake Wood) returned to the serial after being falsely imprisoned for the murder of Lucy Beale (Hetti Bywater). Max agrees with Willmott-Brown's plans as he is unaware of his past and understands that he is a "wronged man". Of his return, Boyde said: "I'm delighted to immerse myself once more in the fascinating world of soap land." Willmott-Brown made an unannounced departure on 28 December 2017, alongside Fi and brother-in-law Hugo Browning (Simon Williams) at the conclusion of their storyline.

In popular culture
A running joke in the 2015 episode of Catherine Tate's Nan titled "Knees Up Wilmott-Brown" involves the lead character, Nan, mistaking another character, Charles Wilmott, for the EastEnders character.

See also
List of soap opera villains

References

External links 

EastEnders characters
Fictional British Army officers
Fictional rapists
Fictional bartenders
Fictional criminals in soap operas
Fictional businesspeople
Fictional characters with cancer
Television characters introduced in 1986
Male characters in television
Male villains
Fictional prisoners and detainees